Iyyampalayam is a panchayat town in Dindigul district  in the state of Tamil Nadu, India. There also exists another village by the same name, in the Dindigul district in Tamil Nadu. For the Ayyampalaym in Dindigul district.

This village is located at the bottom of Kodaikanal.

Demographics
As of 2001 India census, Iyyampalayam had a population of 12,131. Males constitute 50% of the population and females 50%. Iyyampalayam has an average literacy rate of 62%, higher than the national average of 59.5%; with 56% of the males and 44% of females literate. 11% of the population is under 6 years of age.

Persons from this village have joined in the INA founded by Nethaji Subash Chandra Bose. The forefathers of Dr. Subramania Siva lived in this village.

Culture
Pongal festival during the month of January, jallikattu competition will be held with great enthusiasm.

Transportation
This village is connected by road.

Economy
Coconuts and Mangoes are  the main production in this village.

Education
N.P.Ramasamy Memorial Higher Secondary School is the local school.

Religion
The two temples in ayyampalayam are Arulmigu angalaeswariamman thirukovil and muthalamman temple.
Arulmigu Angalaeswariamman thirukovil is located near kattabomman Thidal, Chinna Ayyampalayam. Maha Shivratri is auspicious day for this temple and this festival is celebrated in a very grand way. At first, people in this village will decorate and pray the wooden sacred box which contains sacred items which are more than 150 years old and then the people will head to temple and they will decorate the goddess with silk saree and flowers and offer the food to goddess such as Pongal, pulses, fruits, sweets, tamarind juice. On the next day Pongal will be prepared and sacrificing ceremony will be held and food will be given to poor people.

An ancient Muthalamman Temple festival takes place for three days from Wednesday to Friday. Wednesday night is the most important day of the festival, during that day they bring silk cloth covered goddess statue from Thevarapanpatti and removing this silk cloth and eye opening (prana prathisdai) and decorate the goddess in Alappa gowder's temple house and then only it goes to the temple where festival begins and final Friday aarathi was also taken by Alappa gowder family to the goddess as send of function. Sadayandi swami petti festival is also equivalently important. Periya Ayyanar temple on the bank of Marudanadi river is also a worth seeing place. Pandit Nehru Portrait was given divine status in this temple proves this village people are very patriotic by birth.

References

Cities and towns in Dindigul district